Zakeria Mohammed  "Zak" Yacoob (born 3 March 1948) is an  anti-apartheid activist and a former Justice of the Constitutional Court of South Africa. He was appointed to the bench in 1998 by Nelson Mandela. He briefly served as Acting Deputy Chief Justice during the long-term leave of Dikgang Moseneke. He became blind at 16 months due to meningitis and attended Durban's Arthur Blaxall School for the Blind from 1956 to 1966. From 1967 to 1969 he studied for a Bachelor of Arts degree at the University College for Indians after which he completed his LLB degree at the University of Durban-Westville in 1972. He married in 1970, and has two adult children (a daughter and a son). He has lived in Durban, South Africa almost all his life.

References

1948 births
Living people
Judges of the Constitutional Court of South Africa
South African blind people